Fairfield Township Works I is a registered historic site near Hamilton, Ohio, listed in the National Register on 1971-11-05.

Historic uses 
 Graves/Burials
 Ceremonial Complex

Notes 

Mounds in Ohio
Archaeological sites on the National Register of Historic Places in Ohio
National Register of Historic Places in Butler County, Ohio